Plashbourne Estate is a historic estate located in the Lawrence Park West section of Yonkers, Westchester County, New York. It was designed in 1911 by the architectural firm of Carrère and Hastings and built for artist Violet Oakley (1874–1961) in the Tudor Revival style. It is a -story stone building with an irregular compound plan and cross-gabled roofline.  After 1915, it became the home of Anna Lawrence Bisland (1872–1950), third daughter of William Van Duzer Lawrence, who resided there until her death.  Grayson L. Kirk (1903–1997) resided at Plashbourne Estate from 1973 until his death.

It was added to the National Register of Historic Places in 2007.

References

Houses on the National Register of Historic Places in New York (state)
Tudor Revival architecture in New York (state)
Houses completed in 1915
Buildings and structures in Yonkers, New York
Houses in Westchester County, New York
National Register of Historic Places in Yonkers, New York